Blackwater is the first studio album by the Jacksonville, Florida based band MOFRO.

The recording was named One Of The Best Of The Decade In Music by amazon.com.

The Enhanced CD contains bonus audio and in-studio video.

Track listing

Personnel 

 Chris Belcher – Photography
 Jim DeVito – Engineer
 Siemy Di – Drums
 John Grey – Guitar, Harmonica, Vocals, Group Member
 Daryl Hance – Dobro, Guitar, Group Member
 Kevin Ink – Mixing, Mixing Engineer
 Kenneth Lee – Mastering
 Mofro – Improvisation
 Fabrice Quentin – Bass
 Dominic Robelotto – Audio Engineer
 Nathan Shepherd – Keyboards, Saxophone
 George Sluppick – Percussion, Drums, Vocals (background)
 Michael Stern – Executive Producer
 David Swartz – Producer, Executive Producer
 Mark Waldrep – Producer, Audio Engineer
 Robert Walter – Piano (Electric), Clavinet, Soloist, Clavicembalo, Guest Appearance
 Dan Prothero - producer, engineer, editing, mixing, graphic design, photography, programming

Awards
 One of the 10 Best R&B / Soul Albums of the Year (amazon.com)
 One of the Best Of The Decade In Music (amazon.com)

External links
 MOFRO: Blackwater
 Fog City Records presents: MOFRO

2001 debut albums
JJ Grey & Mofro albums
Fog City Records albums